Eucalyptus yarraensis, commonly known as Yarra gum, is a tree species that is endemic to Victoria, Australia. It has rough bark on the trunk and larger branches, lance-shaped to elliptical or egg-shaped adult leaves, flower buds in groups of seven, white flowers and conical fruit. In 2021 the Victorian Government listed it as critically endangered under the Flora and Fauna Guarantee Act.

Description
It has rough, fibrous, brown or greyish bark on the trunk and larger branches, smooth white to cream-coloured bark above. Flowering occurs from September to December and the flowers are white.

Taxonomy and naming
Eucalyptus yarraensis was first formally described in 1922 by Joseph Maiden and Richard Cambage in Maiden's book, A Critical Revision of the Genus Eucalyptus, from material collected by Cambage in the Yarra Valley near Healesville.

Distribution and habitat
Yarra gum grows in valleys and nearby slopes in open woodland, now mostly cleared for agricultural use. It is found between Melbourne, Daylesford and Ararat.

See also
List of Eucalyptus species

References

External links
Tree Logic

Flora of Victoria (Australia)
Trees of Australia
yarraensis
Myrtales of Australia
Plants described in 1922